La Corona is the name given by archaeologists to an ancient Maya court residence in Guatemala's Petén department that was discovered in 1996, and later identified as the long-sought "Site Q", the source of a long series of unprovenanced limestone reliefs of exceptional artistic quality. The site's Classical name appears to have been Sak-Nikte' ('White-Flower').

The search for 'Site Q'
During the 1960s looted Maya reliefs referring to a then-unknown city surfaced on the international art market. One of these reliefs, showing a ball player, is now in the Chicago Art Institute; another is in the Dallas Museum of Art. Peter Mathews, then a Yale graduate student, dubbed the city "Site Q" (short for ¿Qué? [Spanish for "what?"]). Some researchers believed that the inscriptions referred to Calakmul, but the artistic style of the artifacts was different from anything that had been found there. 

Santiago Billy and Carlos Catalan, environmentalists studying scarlet macaws, came upon the remote ruins in 1996, and Ian Graham and David Stuart from Harvard University's Peabody Museum of Archaeology and Ethnology investigated the site the following year, naming the new site La Corona. Among the broken sculptures left by looters, Stuart found textual references to a place name and to historical figures that were featured on Site Q artifacts, leading him to believe that La Corona was Site Q. 

In 2005 Marcello A. Canuto, then a Yale professor, found a panel in situ at La Corona that mentioned two Site Q rulers. The panel had been quarried from the same rock as the Site Q artifacts, providing convincing evidence that La Corona was indeed Site Q.

Recent research
Since 2008, the site has been investigated by the La Corona Archaeological Project (PRALC) co-directed by Marcello A. Canuto (Director, Middle American Research Institute at Tulane University) and Tomás Barrientos (Director, Dept. of Archaeology, Universidad del Valle de Guatemala). 

In April 2012, PRALC discovered a row of 12 staircase risers with many different relief scenes; another 10 sculpted risers were found looted from their original context but then discarded for being too eroded to be worth selling on the illicit antiquities market. 

The texts of these newly discovered panels contain important historical information about political events in the Classic period; one of the panels (Hieroglyphic Staircase 2, Block 5) contains a reference to 4 Ahau 3 K'ank'in, the notorious 13th baktun-ending.

La Corona and its history
Research focuses on the relationship between the powerful kingdom of Calakmul and La Corona. 

A famous sculpted panel (now in the Dallas Museum of Art) depicts two large palanquins each carrying a royal woman from Calakmul, one standing in a temple pavilion, the other overshadowed by a supernatural protector; the text, however, refers to three women who came from Calakmul's ruling dynasty to marry the kings of La Corona. 

In AD 721, a daughter of the Calakmul king (Yuknoom Took' K'awiil) was married off to a king of La Corona. Four decades earlier, in 679 AD, a daughter of Calakmul's powerful Yuknoom Ch'een had already been given in marriage to a La Corona king. Another, newly discovered relief mentions a visit in between these two dates, in 696, by another Calakmul king (Yuknoom Yich'aak K'ahk'), following Calakmul's defeat by Tikal.

Tours
Marcello Canuto leads tours to La Corona for Far Horizons Archaeological and Cultural trips

Bibliography
Bueche, Paula, 'Maya Scholar Deciphers Meaning of Newly Discovered Monument That Refers to 2012'. Know (online), June 28, 2012
Freidel, David, and Stanley Guenther, 'Bearers of War and Creation', Archaeology (online), January 23, 2003 
Katz, Abram (2005) "Long-Sought Maya City Found in Guatemala"], National Geographic News, accessed September 20, 2006 
Martin, Simon, and Nikolai Grube, Chronicle of the Maya Kings and Queens. Thames&Hudson
Yale University press release (2005) "Long-Sought Maya City – Site Q – Found in Guatemala"], Yale University Office of Public Affairs, accessed September 20, 2006

References

External links
'Bearers of War and Creation'
Royal Throne effigy artifact attributed to La Corona; Dallas Museum of Art
MARI La Corona Archaeological Project

Corona
Archaeological sites in Guatemala
Former populated places in Guatemala